Dais cotinifolia, known as the pompom tree, is a small Southern African tree belonging to the Thymelaeaceae family. It occurs along the east coast northwards from the Eastern Cape, inland along the Drakensberg escarpment through KwaZulu-Natal and the Transvaal, with an isolated population in the Eastern Highlands of Zimbabwe. It flowers profusely during the summer months and produces a multitude of pink, sweet-scented, globular flowerheads about 10 cm across. Depending on the circumstances it can reach a height of up to 12m, although it rarely exceeds 6m in cultivation.

Description
Deciduous, bushy, with neat shape, its height and span only reaches 2-3m (in the UK). It can reach up to 4 metres in Australia.
It has small ovate-oblong shaped and lustrous leaves. It is evergreen in mild climates and deciduous in cool climates. In spring, or in the summer, it bears scented star-shaped rose-lilac, or pink coloured flowers, in flattened clusters that are 8 cm wide across.

Uses
Used as an ornamental in gardens, can be grown as a small tree or multi-stemmed shrub.
It prefers siting in the garden in full sun and in fertile and well drained soils.

Although, it's bark yields fibres that are strong enough to be used as thread.

See also
List of Southern African indigenous trees

References

Thymelaeoideae
Trees of South Africa
Flora of Zimbabwe
Plants described in 1762